We All Love Ella: Celebrating the First Lady of Song is a 2007 tribute album to Ella Fitzgerald produced by Phil Ramone for Verve Records, released to mark the 90th anniversary of her birth. The "all-star" list of featured vocalists is backed for most part by an orchestra led by Rob Mounsey. The album contains the first release of a duet of Ella Fitzgerald and Stevie Wonder, who joined her on stage with her small band at the New Orleans Jazz and Heritage Festival in 1977.

Track listing
"A-Tisket, A-Tasket" (Van Alexander, Ella Fitzgerald)
"Lullaby of Birdland" (George Shearing, George David Weiss)
"The Lady Is a Tramp" (Richard Rodgers, Lorenz Hart)
"Dream a Little Dream of Me" (Fabian Andre, Gus Kahn, Wilbur Schwandt)
"(If You Can't Sing It) You'll Have to Swing It (Mr. Paganini)" (Sam Coslow)
"Oh, Lady Be Good!" (George Gershwin, Ira Gershwin)
"Reaching for the Moon" (Irving Berlin)
"Blues in the Night" (Harold Arlen, Johnny Mercer)
"Miss Otis Regrets" (Cole Porter)
"Someone to Watch over Me" (G. Gershwin, I. Gershwin)
"Do Nothing Till You Hear from Me" (Duke Ellington, Bob Russell)
"Angel Eyes" (Earl Brent, Matt Dennis)
"Too Close for Comfort" (Jerry Bock, George David Weiss, Larry Holofcener) 
"You Are the Sunshine of My Life" (recorded live in New Orleans, 1977) (Stevie Wonder)
"Airmail Special" (Charlie Christian, Benny Goodman, Jimmy Mundy)

Personnel
Featured vocalists and instrumentalists
Natalie Cole with Terry Trotter, piano
Chaka Khan with Tony Kadleck, trumpet
Queen Latifah
Diana Krall with Hank Jones, both on piano
Natalie Cole and Chaka Khan
Dianne Reeves
Lizz Wright with Regina Carter, violin, and Russell Malone, guitar
Ledisi
Linda Ronstadt
Gladys Knight
Etta James
k.d. lang with Tom Scott, tenor saxophone
Michael Bublé
Ella Fitzgerald joined by Stevie Wonder on vocal and piano
Nikki Yanofsky

Orchestra on tracks # 1–8, 11 and 12 was arranged and conducted by Rob Mounsey;
"Someone to Watch over Me" (# 10) was arranged and conducted by Billy Childs;
"Too Close for Comfort" (# 13) arranged by Billy Childs and conducted by Rob Mounsey;
"Miss Otis Regrets" (# 9) sung by Linda Ronstadt with string trio and piano arranged by pianist Alan Broadbent, and produced, recorded and mixed by George Massenburg and co-produced by John Boylan.
The bonus track "Airmail Special" (# 15) was arranged for a jazz quintet and conducted by double bassist John Clayton and produced by Tommy LiPuma.
On tracks # 5, 6, 12 and 13 a string section is added to the big band.
The Australian edition of the album added another bonus track, an interpretation of "Cotton Tail" sung by Dee Dee Bridgewater taken from her own tribute album Dear Ella (Verve, 1997).

References

2007 albums
Ella Fitzgerald tribute albums
Albums produced by Phil Ramone
Verve Records albums